Rezső Kékesi (born 11 January 1958) is a former Hungarian professional footballer who played as a midfielder. He was a member of the Hungarian national football team. He finished his playing career in Switzerland, where he still lives with his family.

Career 
He started his football career in the Ferencváros Vasutas team. From there he moved to Ferencvárosi TC, where he played until 1977. He played in three home matches. In 1977-78 he played for Dorogi FC, between 1978 and 1984 for Volán. He made his debut in the top flight in 1979. From 1984 to 1989 he played for MTK Budapest FC. He won one gold, one silver and one bronze medal each with the MTK Budapest FC. In February 1990, he joined Yverdon-Sport FC of Switzerland. In the Hungarian top flight, he played 231 matches between 1979 and 1989, scoring 18 goals.

National team 
Between 1987 and 1988 he played three times for the national team.

Honours 

 Nemzeti Bajnokság I (NB I)
 Champion: 1986-87

References 

1958 births
Living people
Hungarian footballers
Hungary international footballers
Footballers from Budapest
Association football midfielders
Nemzeti Bajnokság I players
Ferencvárosi TC footballers
Dorogi FC footballers
Volán FC players
MTK Budapest FC players
Yverdon-Sport FC players
Hungarian expatriate footballers
Expatriate footballers in Switzerland
Hungarian expatriate sportspeople in Switzerland